This page is a discography for the musician Mike Oldfield.

Studio albums

Other albums

Soundtracks 
Although the introduction theme was used in The Exorcist, Tubular Bells (1973) was not a soundtrack album.

Oldfield was commissioned to produce the music for NASA's The Space Movie in 1979; no soundtrack album was released at the time. However a DVD and CD soundtrack (though the CD content  is just the audio track from the DVD, including voiceovers and sound effects) were issued in October 2015.

Mike Oldfield also contributed to the movie soundtrack album on The X-Files, with his rendition of Mark Snow's main theme, entitled "Tubular X". Note, this does not appear on all versions of the soundtrack album for the movie.

The only full film score which Oldfield has written, was for the 1984 film The Killing Fields (See The Killing Fields soundtrack album).

Orchestral arrangements 
In 1975 David Bedford arranged Oldfield's first two albums, Tubular Bells and Hergest Ridge, for orchestra.  These were both performed and recorded, however only The Orchestral Tubular Bells was released to the public as an album, and reached number 17 in the UK Albums Chart.  Even though The Orchestral Hergest Ridge was not released, sections were used in the soundtrack to The Space Movie.

Live albums 
There is only one officially released Oldfield live audio album, Exposed, although others have been released on video (see below). Exposed reached number 16 in the UK Album Chart, was certified as Silver in the UK and was recorded in 1979.

The alternate version of Platinum, Airborn is a US-only 2-LP release from 1980. One LP being a version of Platinum, the other having a live version of Tubular Bells part one and a live/studio version of Incantations. Note, they are not the same recordings as Exposed.

Warner's Sight&Sound edition of The Art in Heaven Concert includes a CD of Oldfield's new millennium live performance in Berlin.

The Special Edition of Music of the Spheres also contains the only live performance of the piece given by Oldfield (Bilbao 2008).

Live CDs were also included in the Mercury Records Deluxe Editions of Oldfield's albums: Platinum (Live at Wembley Arena, May 1980), QE2 (Live from the European Adventure Tour), Five Miles Out (Live in Cologne – 6 December 1982 – Five Miles Out Tour), Crises (Live Highlights from Wembley Arena 22 July 1983 Crises Tour; Live at Wembley Arena 22 July 1983 Crises Tour).

Album reissues 
There have been a number of reissue releases of Oldfield's work.

The most notable reissue sets have been of Oldfield's Virgin Records albums Tubular Bells through Heaven's Open:
 In 2000 Virgin issued HDCD reissues of the albums.
 This included a hybrid  SACD version of Tubular Bells, containing a new remaster of the original LP in 2-channel CDDA and DSD, and a new remaster of the 1975 quadraphonic mix.
 In the 2000s Virgin Japan released the albums with Mini-LP style artwork.
 From 2009, when Oldfield's Virgin albums were transferred to Mercury Records (later Virgin EMI) they were slowly reissued with bonus material. In 2009 Tubular Bells was released in multiple editions including an Ultimate Edition and a Deluxe Edition. The Ultimate Edition contained 3 CDs, 1 DVD, 1 Vinyl, 1 Book and other items.
 Hergest Ridge and Ommadawn were reissued in June 2010, and Incantations followed in July 2011.
 On 30 July 2012 two more albums were re-issued, Platinum and QE2.  Both are available as both a standard single CD edition, a 2 CD deluxe edition and a limited edition coloured vinyl LP (blue for Platinum, white for QE2). Both albums have been remastered and the releases were supervised by Mike Oldfield.
 On 2 September 2013 Five Miles Out and Crises (also in a 5 disc edition) were reissued.
 On 29 January 2016 Discovery and The Killing Fields were reissued. Discovery is a 2 CD, 1 DVD release including a CD of the 1984 Suite, a combination of the works from Oldfield's two 1984 albums.

Singles 

Oldfield has had more than 25 charting singles in the UK. Oldfield's highest charting single in the UK is "Portsmouth", which charted at number 3, however "Moonlight Shadow" reached number 1 on many European charts.

Compilations and remixes

Video/DVD 

Other:
 On 4 June 1977 a documentary showing Oldfield working on Ommadawn was transmitted on UK television, as a part of Tony Palmer's series All You Need Is Love: The Story of Popular Music. The whole series was released in a 5 DVD collection in 2008.
 In 2003 Warner Music released a DVD-Audio with Tubular Bells 2003 in 5.1 Surround sound. The DVD includes also the original Tubular Bells demos of 1971.
 DVDs with diverse music videos, live performances and 5.1 Surround mixes are being included in Mercury Records Deluxe Editions of Oldfield's albums.

Collaborations

References

External links 
 Mike Oldfield Discography – The official Mike Oldfield website discography
 Mike Oldfield Discography at Tubular.net
 Mike Oldfield Discography at Amadian.net
 
 Argiers - Mike Oldfield's collector corner, includes  Rainer-Muenz's lists

Discography
Discographies of British artists
Pop music discographies